Gordian II (192 – April 238) was Roman emperor with his father Gordian I in 238 AD, the Year of the Six Emperors. Seeking to overthrow Maximinus Thrax, he died in battle outside Carthage. Since he died before his father, Gordian II had the shortest reign of any Roman emperor, at 22 days.

Early life
Born  192, Gordian II was the only known son of Gordian I, who was said to be related to prominent senators. His praenomen and nomen Marcus Antonius suggest that his paternal ancestors received Roman citizenship under the triumvir Mark Antony, or one of his daughters, during the late Roman Republic.  Gordian's cognomen "Gordianus" suggests that his family origins were from Anatolia, especially Galatia and Cappadocia.

According to the notoriously unreliable Historia Augusta, his mother was a Roman woman called Fabia Orestilla, born circa 165, who the Historia claims was a descendant of emperors Antoninus Pius and Marcus Aurelius through her father Fulvus Antoninus. Modern historians have dismissed this name and her information as false. There is some evidence to suggest that Gordian's mother might have been the granddaughter of the Greek Sophist, consul and tutor Herodes Atticus. His younger sister was Antonia Gordiana, who was the mother of Emperor Gordian III.

Although the memory of the Gordians would have been cherished by the Senate and thus appear sympathetic in any senatorial documentation of the period, the only account of Gordian's early career that has survived is contained within the Historia Augusta, and it cannot be taken as an accurate or reliable description of his life story prior to his elevation to the purple in 238. According to this source, Gordian served as quaestor in Elagabalus' reign and as praetor and consul suffect with Emperor Severus Alexander. In 237 or 238, Gordian went to the province of Africa Proconsularis as a legatus under his father, who served as proconsular governor.

Revolt against Maximinus Thrax
Early in 235, Emperor Alexander Severus and his mother Julia Avita Mamaea were assassinated by mutinous troops at Moguntiacum (now Mainz) in Germania Inferior. The leader of the rebellion, Maximinus Thrax, became Emperor, despite his low-born background and the disapproval of the Roman Senate. Confronted by a local elite that had just killed Maximinus's procurator, Gordian's father was forced to participate in a full-scale revolt against Maximinus in 238, probably at the end of March. Due to Gordian I's advanced age, the younger Gordian, said to be 46 years old, was attached to the imperial throne and acclaimed augustus too. Like his father, he too was awarded the cognomen "Africanus".

Father and son saw their claim to the throne ratified both by the Senate and most of the other provinces, due to Maximinus' unpopularity.

Opposition would come from the neighbouring province of Numidia. Capelianus, governor of Numidia, a loyal supporter of Maximinus Thrax, and who held a grudge against Gordian, renewed his allegiance to the reigning emperor and invaded Africa province with the only legion stationed in the region, III Augusta, and other veteran units. Gordian II, at the head of a militia army of untrained soldiers, lost the Battle of Carthage and was killed. According to the Historia Augusta, his body was never recovered. Hearing the news, his father killed himself. The Gordians ruled only 22 days. This first rebellion against Maximinus Thrax was unsuccessful, but by the end of 238 Gordian II's nephew, Gordian III, would be recognised as emperor by the whole Roman world.

According to Edward Gibbon, in the first volume of The History of the Decline and Fall of the Roman Empire (1776–89), "Twenty-two acknowledged concubines, and a library of sixty-two thousand volumes, attested to the variety of [Gordian's] inclinations; and from the productions that he left behind him, it appears that the former as well as the latter were designed for use rather than ostentation."

Family tree

See also
Villa Gordiani

References

Sources

Primary sources
 Aurelius Victor, Epitome de Caesaribus
 Herodian, Roman History, Book 7
 Historia Augusta, The Three Gordians
 Joannes Zonaras, Compendium of History
 Zosimus, Historia Nova

Secondary sources
 
 Gibbon, Edward (1888). The History of the Decline and Fall of the Roman Empire

External links

 Gordian II coinage

192 births
238 deaths
3rd-century Roman emperors
Crisis of the Third Century
Roman emperors killed in battle
Deified Roman emperors
Antonii
Gordian dynasty
Sons of Roman emperors